Two ships of the Royal Navy have been named HMS Havant :

  a  launched in 1919 and sold in 1922 to Thailand as HTMS Chow Praya. She was stricken in 1971
  a  launched in 1939 as the Brazilian Javary but purchased before completion and renamed. She was sunk in 1940

Royal Navy ship names